Ik (also known as Icetot, Icietot, Ngulak or (derogatory) Teuso, Teuth) is one of the Kuliak languages of northeastern Uganda. The Kuliak languages form their own branch of the proposed Nilo-Saharan language family. With the other two Kuliak languages being moribund, Ik may soon be the sole remaining language of its family. 

A comprehensive dictionary and grammar of Ik has been published in Schrock (2017).

Names
The Ik refer to their own language as Icé-tód [ītʃé-tôd̥̚].

According to Schrock (2015), as a spurious language, Dorobo does not actually exist as a fourth Kuliak language, and may at most be a dialect of Ik.

Distribution
Ik speakers have traditionally resided in Kamion Subcounty, Kaabong District, Uganda, with the Kamion Subcounty consisting of the five parishes Kapalu, Timu, Kamion, Lokwakaramoe, and Morungole. Their traditional homeland is a 50 kilometer-long narrow strip of territory along the Kenya-Uganda border, stretching from Mount Morungole and Kidepo National Park in the north to Mount Lopokok and Timu Forest in the south. Some Ik-speaking villages in Kaabong District are Pirre, Morungole, and Oropoi.

Within the past few decades, Ik-speaking communities have also sprouted up in the following locations.
Several hundred Ik in New Site, South Sudan (in Eastern Equatoria state, South Sudan)
Approximately 100 Ik across towns and cities northwestern Kenya, including Kakuma
A small Ik community in Masindi District, western Uganda

Sociolinguistics 
Today, Ik is a highly vital language, although many speakers are also fluent in the local Teso–Turkana languages (such as the Dodoth dialect of Karimojong), Swahili, and to a lesser extent, English.

The Ik language is still stable, as young children still learn the language and remain monolingual until they go to school, and Ik is spoken in all domains of life. Although the community subtly pressures its children to learn more widely spoken languages like Turkana, they see this multilingualism as good without being detrimental to the vitality of their own language. The community sees the language as vital to maintaining their ethnic identity and wants their children to learn Ik in school.

Phonology 
The Ik phonemic inventory, as documented by Schrock (2014), is given below.

Consonants include ejectives and implosives.

Ik displays ATR vowel harmony.

Three additional phonemes, were originally in the language but were lost in the early 21st century.

Lexicon
Some Ik names for native plants and animals (which are aso found in Kidepo National Park) are:

Flora

Ik crops include:
sorghum (ŋám)
finger millet (rébᵃ)
maize (ɲaɓʊraˊ) (introduced New World crop)
pumpkins (kaiɗeˊ) (introduced New World crop)
beans (moriɗᵃ)
vegetable greens (waicíkᵃ)

Fauna

Society
Like the neighboring Nilotic peoples, the Ik people have age-groups (cohorts), each with its own assigned totem. Nowadays, the traditional Ik age-group system is mostly obsolete (Heine 1999).

Basaúr ‘Eland’
Gasar ‘Buffalo’
Gwaɪt́ sʼᵃ ‘Giraffe’
Kaɗokóⁱ ‘Vervet monkey’
Koɗowᵃ ‘Gazelle’
Leweɲ ‘Ostrich’
Ráɡwᵃ ‘Ox’

Traditional Ik society also has terms for specific prohibitions and taboos, such as:
bɔsɛ́s ‘prohibition against fining children or youth’
cuᵉ ‘prohibition against failing to give water to elders first’
dɛ ‘prohibition against failing to give leg-meat to elders’
ifófóés ‘prohibition against eating the first harvest secretly’
imwáŋón ‘prohibition against seeing your mother-in-law’

See also
Ik word list (Wiktionary)

Notes

References

Further reading  
 Schrock, Terrill. 2008. Ik (SIL Comparative African Word List ). ComparaLex.

Kuliak languages
Languages of Uganda
Kaabong District